{{Infobox person
| name               = Jordan Luke Gage
| image              = 
| caption            = 
| birth_date         = 
| birth_place        = Reading, Berkshire, England
| alma_mater         = Mountview Academy of Theatre Arts
| spouse             = 
| occupation         = Actor, singer
| years_active       = 
| known_for          = & Juliet (2019-2022) 
Bonnie & Clyde (2022-2023) 
| children           = 
| relatives          = 
| awards             =
}}

Jordan Luke Gage (born 8 April 1992) is a British actor. Though he has appeared in several television shows, Gage is best known as a musical theatre performer, most notably originating the roles of Romeo in the 2019 jukebox musical & Juliet and Clyde Barrow in the 2022 gangster musical Bonnie & Clyde on the West End.

 Early life and education 
As a child, Gage's family tradition was to attend a West End show on Christmas Eve every year, with Gage describing productions of The Lion King at age eight and Les Misérables at age thirteen as two integral shows that drew him towards performing. He attended stage camps in his youth and performed for the first time when he was in Year 7 at school and was cast as Mike Teevee in a production of Charlie and the Chocolate Factory. After leaving Leighton Park School he attended Mountview Academy of Theatre Arts for his BA training after winning a BBC scholarship. While in education, he appeared in productions of My Fair Lady, Girlfriends and Bat Boy: The Musical.

 Acting career 
Gage appeared as a contestant on the twelfth series of The X Factor and received four "yeses" from the judges during the auditions after performing "See You Again" by Charlie Puth.

In 2017, Gage portrayed the role of ensemble member Hoffman in Jim Steinman's Bat Out of Hell: The Musical and also acted as the alternate for the lead role of Strat before taking over as the lead full-time on 4 September 2018 at the Dominion Theatre when original leading actor Andrew Polec left the production. As part of promotion for the show, Gage and the cast performed "Bat Out of Hell" in front of 30,000 people in Hyde Park as part of The Proms.

Gage created the role of Romeo Montague in the Max Martin jukebox musical & Juliet at the show's world premiere at the Manchester Opera House between 10 September and 12 October 2019 and remained a part of the cast when it transferred to the Shaftesbury Theatre on 20 November. He performed six songs on the official West End cast recording: "It's My Life", "Love Me like You Do", "One More Try", "Can't Feel My Face", "Everybody" and "I Want It That Way". The show was forced to close in March 2020 due to the COVID-19 pandemic and, in the interim, Gage starred as Jason "J.D." Dean in a summer revival of Heathers: The Musical at the Theatre Royal Haymarket alongside Christina Bennington. Gage returned to the cast of & Juliet when the show reopened in September 2021. In January 2022, he announced that he was leaving the show and played  his final performance on 26 March.

On 23 February 2022, it was announced that Gage would portray the lead role of Clyde Barrow in the original West End cast of Bonnie & Clyde, alongside Frances Mayli McCann as Bonnie Parker, who he had previously performed with in Heathers; The Musical, as McCann had portrayed Heather McNamara. Performances began at the Arts Theatre on 9 April 2022 and the show finished its run on 10 July. During this run, Gage also participated in a one-off script in hand reading of The Pride in order to celebrate 50 years since the UK's first gay pride rally. On 23 October, Gage performed his first solo concerts at The Outernet. Gage subsequently played Fabrizio Naccarelli in a staged concert version of The Light in the Piazza at Alexandra Palace on 27 November. On 7 November, it was announced that Bonnie & Clyde'' would be returning to the West End on 4 March 2023, though this time at the Garrick Theatre, with Gage and McCann reprising their roles.

Personal life 
Gage is openly gay, first discussing his sexuality publicly in 2021.

Filmography

Film & TV

Theatre credits

Accolades

References

External links
 

1992 births
Living people
21st-century English male actors
English male musical theatre actors
actors from Reading, Berkshire
English gay actors